Olanipekun is a Yoruba surname common in Nigeria.

Notable people with the surname 

 Matthew Olanipekun Sadiku, American electrical engineer
 Nelson Olanipekun, Nigerian human rights lawyer
 Wole Olanipekun, Nigerian jurist

Nigerian names